Edward A. Caban (born September 8, 1967) is an American police officer and First Deputy New York City Police Commissioner appointed by Keechant Sewell.

Early life and career 
Caban, born and raised in The Bronx, joined the NYPD in 1991 and rose through the ranks to sergeant three years later. He made his way up to inspector and has worked in a variety of precincts, most recently as the adjutant in Brooklyn North patrol.

References 

1967 births
Living people
Deputy New York City Police Commissioners
People from the Bronx